Kennedy Gollan Montrose Graham (born 1946) is a New Zealand politician and former Member of Parliament for the Green Party. He has served in the New Zealand Foreign Service for sixteen years, and lectured at the University of Canterbury and Victoria University of Wellington.

He is the brother of Sir Douglas Graham, a former National Party MP (1984–1999) and cabinet minister (1990–1999). He is also a great-grandson of Robert Graham, an MP from 1855 to 1868.

Education
Graham has a Bachelor of Commerce (BCom) from the University of Auckland, a Masters of Arts (MA) in International Relations from The Fletcher School of Law and Diplomacy at Tufts University in Medford, Massachusetts, and a PhD from Victoria University of Wellington. He received Fulbright and Fletcher scholarships (1972), a McCarthy Fellowship (1986) and a Quatercentenary Fellowship at Emmanuel College, Cambridge University (1995).

Career
As a New Zealand diplomat, Graham was involved in the negotiation of the South Pacific Nuclear Free Zone in the mid-1980s, and represented New Zealand's nuclear-free policy in the Conference on Disarmament in Geneva in the late 1980s. He worked as secretary-general of Parliamentarians for Global Action in New York (1989–1994), where he developed the concept of the "planetary interest" for promotion in parliaments around the world. From 1996 to 1998, Graham worked in Stockholm at the International Institute for Democracy and Electoral Assistance, holding the position of director of planning and coordination. Graham was also a United Nations official working as a director at the UN University Leadership Academy (Amman, Jordan) from 1999 to 2002, and later as senior consultant in the Department of Political Affairs (2005–2006). He was also a visiting professor at the College of Europe in Bruges/Belgium, teaching International Relations at MA level.

In 2007, after returning to New Zealand, he became adjunct senior fellow at the University of Canterbury School of Law, and was a senior lecturer at Victoria University of Wellington.

Graham is founding director and trustee for the New Zealand Center for Global Studies, which commenced in 2013.

Member of Parliament

First term: 2008–2011
After standing in the Ilam electorate during the 2008 election, Graham was elected as a list MP after counting of the special votes. In his maiden speech, Graham noted that: "We are drawing down on Earth's natural resources, borrowing forward on the human heritage, irretrievably encroaching on our children's right to inherit the Earth in a natural and sustainable state."

In July 2009 Graham's International Non-Aggression and Lawful Use of Force Bill was drawn from the member's ballot. The bill would have outlawed the crime of aggression in New Zealand domestic law, with imprisonment for any New Zealand leader involved, and also required the government to table a legal opinion in Parliament before committing any forces to overseas military operations. The bill was voted down at its first reading, 64 to 58.

Second term: 2011–2014

In 2011, Graham stood again in Ilam and was re-elected as a list MP.

In June 2013, Graham organised a public one-day climate change conference which was held at the old Legislative Council chamber at Parliament. The conference explored the state of climate science, the link between international action and domestic responsibility, the roles of civil society and businesses, available policy mechanisms, and ended with a political panel of MPs discussing climate change.

Third term: 2014–2017
At the 2014 general election, Graham was listed at number 7 on the Green party list. The ranking was two places lower than his 2011 ranking of number 5. Graham contested the Helensville electorate and was re-elected as a list MP. Graham holds the Green caucus portfolios of Assoc. Social Development: Veterans Affairs, Global Affairs (including Defence and Disarmament), and National Intelligence and Security (including NZSIS and GCSB). He serves on the Foreign Affairs Committee and the Privileges Committee. In October 2015, Graham formed a cross-party group, GLOBE-NZ, working on climate change. GLOBE-NZ is a national chapter of GLOBE-International, and has 35 MP's as members drawn from all seven political parties represented in the 51st Parliament. As chairman of the national chapter, Graham contracted a London-based consultancy, Vivid Economics, to prepare a report on "transformational pathways to carbon neutrality for New Zealand". The report, Net Zero in New Zealand: Scenarios to achieve domestic emission reduction the second half of the century, was launched in the New Zealand Parliament in March 2017. The initiative is regarded as a major step forward in clarifying inter-party discourse and debate on New Zealand's national climate change policy.

On 7 August 2017, Graham and Party whip David Clendon announced that they were planning to resign as Green Party candidates for the 2017 election, after revelations that Party co-leader Metiria Turei committed benefit and electoral fraud. Graham and Clendon stated that their resignations were due to the public positions she had taken regarding her offending, and her subsequent refusal to step down from her leadership role.  The next day, both Clendon and Graham resigned from the Party caucus, after there were moves to remove them involuntarily. On 9 August 2017, Turei resigned as Co-Leader of the Party and as a list candidate for the 2017 election. After Turei announced her resignation, Graham asked to be returned to the Green Party list, however co-leader James Shaw said he felt it unlikely to happen though acknowledged it was up to the party's executive to ultimately decide the issue. On 12 August it was announced that Graham's appeal to rejoin the list had been declined by the party executive.

He gave his valedictory speech in Parliament on 16 August. He said he was leaving without "hard feelings", and said that: "If politics transgresses conscience, politics must cede.” Graham noted he was proud of the cross-party group on climate change he formed at Parliament ("Globe-NZ"), which produced a plan for New Zealand to reach zero net carbon emissions by 2050.

Publications
 Graham, Kennedy (2008). Models of Regional Governance: Sovereignty and the future architecture of regionalism. Canterbury University Press.
 Graham, Kennedy (2006). "Regional Security and Global Governance: A study of interaction between regional agencies and the UN Security Council". Brussels: UN University/VUB Institute for European Studies.
 Graham, Kennedy (1999). The Planetary Interest: An Emerging Concept for the Global Age. New Jersey: UCL Press, London & Rutgers.
 Graham, Kennedy (1989). National Security Concepts of States: New Zealand. New York: Taylor & Francis for UNIDIR.

Peer reviewed books, book chapters, books edited
 Graham, Kennedy (2015). 'Global Citizenship & Global Constitutionalism" for publication by Martinus Nijhoff / Brill in 2015.
 Graham, Kennedy (editor) (2008). Models of Regional Governance: Sovereignty and the Architecture of Pacific Regionalism, Christchurch: University of Canterbury Press.
 Graham, Kennedy and Tania Felicio (2006). Regional Security and Global Governance: A Study of Interaction between Regional Agencies and the UN Security Council; With a Proposal for a Regional-Global Security Mechanism, Brussels: VUB University Press.
 Graham, Kennedy (editor) (1999). The Planetary Interest, New Brunswick: Rutgers University Press.
 Graham, Kennedy (1989). National Security Concepts of States: New Zealand, New York: Taylor & Francis, Inc.

References

External links

 Biography at the Green Party of Aotearoa New Zealand (archived 5 July 2017)
 Profile at New Zealand Parliament website

1946 births
Fellows of Emmanuel College, Cambridge
Green Party of Aotearoa New Zealand MPs
Living people
New Zealand diplomats
University of Auckland alumni
Academic staff of the University of Canterbury
Victoria University of Wellington alumni
Academic staff of the Victoria University of Wellington
New Zealand list MPs
The Fletcher School at Tufts University alumni
Academic staff of the College of Europe
Academic staff of United Nations University
Members of the New Zealand House of Representatives
21st-century New Zealand politicians
Fulbright alumni